When Did You Leave Heaven is a studio album by Swedish singer Lisa Ekdahl. It was released in 1995 by BMG and by RCA records, and a special edition was released through Phantom Records.

Track listings

RCA 
 "When Did You Leave Heaven"
 "But Not For Me"
 "Cry Me A River"
 "Love For Sale"
 "Lush Life"
 "You're Going to See a Lot of Me"
 "It was Just One of Those Things"
 "Boy Next Door"
 "I'm a Fool to Want You"
 "My Heart Belongs to Daddy"
 "Blame it on My Youth"

Phantom
 "When Did You Leave Heaven"
 "But Not for Me"
 "Cry Me a River"
 "Love for Sale"
 "Lush Life"
 "You're Gonna See a Lot of Me"
 "It's Oh So Quiet"*
 "It Was Just One of Those Things"
 "The Boy Next Door"
 "I'm a Fool to Want You"
 "My Heart Belongs to Daddy"
 "Blame It on My Youth"
 "It's Oh So Quiet"*
* denotes track not on standard edition

Charts

References

1997 albums
Lisa Ekdahl albums